Ngizim may refer to:
 Ngizim people
 Ngizim language

Language and nationality disambiguation pages